Fissidentalium is a genus of molluscs belonging to the family Dentaliidae.

The genus has cosmopolitan distribution.

Species

Species:

 Species Fissidentalium actiniophorum Shimek, 1997
 Species Fissidentalium aegeum (R. B. Watson, 1879)
 Species Fissidentalium amphialum (R. B. Watson, 1879)
 Species Fissidentalium candidum (Jeffreys, 1877)
 Species Fissidentalium capillosum (Jeffreys, 1877)
 Species Fissidentalium ceras (R. B. Watson, 1879)
 Species Fissidentalium complexum (Dall, 1895)
 Species Fissidentalium concinnum (E. von Martens, 1878)
 Species Fissidentalium cornubovis (E. A. Smith, 1906)
 Species Fissidentalium edenensis Lamprell & Healy, 1998
 Species Fissidentalium elizabethae Lamprell & Healy, 1998
 Species Fissidentalium erosum Shimek & Moreno, 1996
 Species Fissidentalium eualdes (Barnard, 1963)
 Species Fissidentalium eupatrides (Melvill & Standen, 1907)
 Species Fissidentalium exasperatum (G. B. Sowerby III, 1903)
 Species Fissidentalium franklinae Lamprell & Healy, 1998
 Species Fissidentalium metivieri Scarabino, 1995
 Species Fissidentalium opacum (G. B. Sowerby I, 1828)
 Species Fissidentalium paucicostatum (R. B. Watson, 1879)
 Species Fissidentalium peruvianum (Dall, 1908)
 Species Fissidentalium platypleurum (Tomlin, 1931)
 Species Fissidentalium ponderi Lamprell & Healy, 1998
 Species Fissidentalium profundorum (E. A. Smith, 1894)
 Species Fissidentalium horikoshii Okutani, 1982
 Species Fissidentalium kawamurai Kuroda & Habe, 1961
 Species Fissidentalium laterischismum Shikama & Habe, 1963
 Species Fissidentalium levii Scarabino, 1995
 Species Fissidentalium lima Kuroda & Habe, 1963
 Species Fissidentalium magnificum (E. A. Smith, 1896)
 Species Fissidentalium malayanum (Boissevain, 1906)
 Species Fissidentalium megathyris (Dall, 1890)
 Species Fissidentalium sahlmanni Dharma & Eng, 2009
 Species Fissidentalium salpinx Tomlin, 1931
 Species Fissidentalium semivestitum (Locard, 1897)
 Species Fissidentalium serrulatum (E. A. Smith, 1906)
 Species Fissidentalium shirleyae Lamprell & Healy, 1998
 Species Fissidentalium shoplandi (Jousseaume, 1894)
 Species Fissidentalium tenuicostatum Z. Qi & X.-T. Ma, 1989
 Species Fissidentalium transversostriatum Boissevain, 1906
 Species Fissidentalium verconis Cotton & Ludbrook, 1938
 Species Fissidentalium vicdani Kosuge, 1981
 Species Fissidentalium waterhousae Lamprell & Healy, 1998
 Species Fissidentalium yokoyamai (Makiyama, 1931)
 Species Fissidentalium zelandicum (G. B. Sowerby II, 1860)

 Species Fissidentalium scamnatum (Locard, 1897) accepted as Fissidentalium capillosum (Jeffreys, 1877) (junior synonym)
 Species Fissidentalium meridionale (Pilsbry & Sharp, 1897) accepted as Fissidentalium candidum (Jeffreys, 1877) (synonym)
 Species Fissidentalium majorinum (Mabille & Rochebrune, 1889) accepted as Dentalium majorinum Mabille & Rochebrune, 1889
 Species Fissidentalium pseudohungerfordi Sahlmann, van der Beek & Wiese, 2016 accepted as Compressidentalium pseudohungerfordi (Sahlmann, van der Beek & Wiese, 2016) (original combination)
 Species Fissidentalium gaussianum (Plate, 1908) accepted as Dentalium majorinum Mabille & Rochebrune, 1889
 Species Fissidentalium georgiense (Henderson, 1920) accepted as Antalis occidentalis (Stimpson, 1851) (synonym)
 Subgenus Fissidentalium (Compressidentalium) Habe, 1963 accepted as Compressidentalium Habe, 1963
 Species Fissidentalium (Compressidentalium) hungerfordi (Pilsbry & Sharp, 1897) accepted as Compressidentalium hungerfordi (Pilsbry & Sharp, 1897)
 Species Fissidentalium (Compressidentalium) pseudohungerfordi Sahlmann, van der Beek & Wiese, 2016 accepted as Compressidentalium pseudohungerfordi (Sahlmann, van der Beek & Wiese, 2016) (basionym)
 Subgenus Fissidentalium (Pictodentalium) Habe, 1963 accepted as Pictodentalium (Habe, 1963)
 Species Fissidentalium (Pictodentalium) formosum (Adams & Reeve, 1850) accepted as Pictodentalium formosum (A. Adams & Reeve, 1850)
 Subspecies Fissidentalium (Pictodentalium) formosum harrisoni Habe, 1970 accepted as Pictodentalium formosum (A. Adams & Reeve, 1850)
 Species Fissidentalium exuberans (Locard, 1897) accepted as Fissidentalium paucicostatum (R. B. Watson, 1879) (junior synonym)
 Species Fissidentalium floridense (Henderson, 1920) accepted as Coccodentalium carduus (Dall, 1889) (synonymy)
 Species Fissidentalium formosum (A. Adams & Reeve, 1850) accepted as Pictodentalium formosum (A. Adams & Reeve, 1850)
 Species Fissidentalium ergasticum (P. Fischer, 1883) accepted as Fissidentalium capillosum (Jeffreys, 1877) (junior synonym)
 Species Fissidentalium carduum (Dall, 1889) accepted as Coccodentalium carduus (Dall, 1889)
 Species Fissidentalium carduus (Dall, 1889) accepted as Coccodentalium carduus (Dall, 1889)

References

Molluscs